Koyo may refer to:

 Kōyō, a masculine Japanese given name
 Koyo Electronics Corporation Limited, a Japanese electronics corporation
 Koyo language (disambiguation)
 Koyō, a French music producer
 Koyo (band), an American punk rock band
 5591 Koyo, a main-belt asteroid
 KOYO-LP, a low-power radio station (107.1 FM) licensed to serve Oroville, California, United States
 Koyö, a French music producer
 Koyo Loans, a UK personal loan lender

See also
 Koyo Seiko, a manufacturer of ball and roller bearings
 Koyo Zom, highest peak in the Hindu Raj range, Pakistan
 Kōyō Gunkan, a record of the military exploits of the Takeda family, Japan
 Hankyū Kōyō Line, a railway line of Hankyu Railway in Hyōgo Prefecture, Japan
 Kōyōen Station, railway station in Nishinomiya, Hyōgo Prefecture, Japan
 Fukushima Prefectural Iwaki Koyo High School, public (prefectural) high school in Iwaki, Fukushima Prefecture, Japan
 Koyo Gakuin High School, private junior and senior high schools for boys
 Fukuoka Prefectural Asakura Koyo High School, public (prefectural) in Asakura, Fukuoka Prefecture, Japan
 Koyo High School, private high school in Ōmura, Nagasaki Prefecture, Japan
 Kyoto Prefectural Koyo High School, public (prefectural) high school in Mukō, Kyoto, Japan
 Miyagi Prefecture Kesennuma Koyo High School, public (prefectural) in Kesennuma, Miyagi Prefecture, Japan
 Nagoya Koyo Senior High School, public (municipal) high school in Nagoya, Aichi Prefecture, Japan
 Okayama Prefectural Koyo High School in Okayama, Okayama Prefecture, Japan
 Okinawa Prefectural High School, public (prefectural) high school in Yaese, Okinawa Prefecture, Japan
 Wakayama Koyo High School, public (prefectural) high school in Wakayama, Wakayama Prefecture, Japan